Les Dames d'Escoffier is an American society of professional women involved in the food, fine beverage, and hospitality industries.

History
Les Dames d'Escoffier is a leadership culinary organization composed of women who have not only achieved success in their profession, but who contribute significantly to their communities. Since its incorporation in 1976, Les Dames d'Escoffier has followed its mission to elevate the profession through mentoring members and helping worthy students succeed in their culinary careers. I am very proud to be a member.
— Julia Child, 2001

Les Dames d'Escoffier was founded in New York City in 1976, by food writer Carol Brock, in honor of Auguste Escoffier, whom Les Dames' mission statement credits with having "single-handedly brought the culinary art into the modern era". Escoffier "elevated the role of cooks from that of laborers to artists"; when he died, he "left the world a new art, that of dining". With expansion to other cities, Les Dames d'Escoffier International (LDEI) was formed in 1985 to operate as an umbrella organization. Membership is open to women who have distinguished themselves in the respective fields with which Les Dames is concerned. The female society is a response to the all-male Les Amis d'Escoffier society.

Events
Les Dames organizes various food-related activities throughout the year, the majority of which are dinners; new members are inducted during the "annual gala dinners". Les Dames' major philanthropic activity consists of promoting the education and advancement of women in careers related to food industries. The society provides scholarships for women desiring to become professionals or to advance their skills in the fields of food, wine, other beverages, nutrition, the arts of the table and related disciplines.

Members 

 Suzanne Warner Pierot
 Beth D’Addono
 Stephanie Carter
 Caroline Nabors
 Sheilah Kaufman
 Sasha Raj
 Tiffanie Barriere
 Jennifer Goldman

References

External links
Official website - International
Official website - New York chapter

Culinary arts
Organizations established in 1976
1976 establishments in New York City